The Lombardy Apartment Building is a historic apartment building in downtown Cincinnati, Ohio, United States.  A Victorian structure erected in 1885, it is a seven-story building with a metal-covered Mansard roof, built with brick walls and a stone foundation.  Constructed by the firm of Thomas Emery's Sons, Cincinnati's leading real estate developers during the 1880s, it was one of the earliest large apartment buildings erected in the city.  It is one of four large apartment complexes erected by the Emerys during the 1880s; only the Brittany and the Lombardy Apartment Buildings have endured to the present day.  Both the Lombardy and the Brittany were built in 1885 according to designs by Samuel Hannaford; at that time, his independent architectural practice was gaining great prominence in the Cincinnati metropolitan area.

Among the distinctive elements of the Lombardy's architecture are plentiful pilasters with Corinthian-style capitals, an elaborate cornice and brackets, and multiple balconies of wrought iron.  Although the walls are primarily brick, they are decorated with elements of sandstone, along with limestone details and projections.

In 1976, the Lombardy Apartment Building and many surrounding buildings were designated a historic district, the West Fourth Street Historic District, and added to the National Register of Historic Places.  Four years later, the Lombardy was individually listed on the Register, due to its well-preserved historic architecture; it was seen as one of the region's finest examples of late 19th century urban Victorian architecture.  Dozens of other properties in Cincinnati, including the Brittany Apartment Building, were added to the Register at the same time as part of a multiple property submission of buildings designed by Samuel Hannaford.

References

Residential buildings completed in 1885
Apartment buildings in Cincinnati
National Register of Historic Places in Cincinnati
Victorian architecture in Ohio
Historic district contributing properties in Ohio
Residential buildings on the National Register of Historic Places in Ohio